Penrose may refer to:

Places

United States
 Penrose, Arlington, Virginia, a neighborhood
 Penrose, Colorado, a town
 Penrose, St. Louis, Missouri, a neighborhood
 Penrose, Philadelphia, Pennsylvania, a neighborhood
 Penrose, North Carolina, an unincorporated community
 Penrose, Utah, an unincorporated community
 Penrose, Virginia, an historic district in Arlington County

Elsewhere
 Penrose, New South Wales (Wingecarribee), Australia
 Penrose, New South Wales (Wollongong), New South Wales, Australia
 Penrose, Cornwall, a country house and National Trust estate in England
 Penrose, New Zealand
 Penrose Peak (disambiguation)
 Penrose railway station (disambiguation)

People 

 Penrose Hallowell (c. 1928–2021), Pennsylvania secretary of agriculture
 Penrose Stout (1887–1934), American architect
 Penrose (surname), including a list of people with the name

Other uses
 Penrose (brand), a brand name owned by ConAgra Foods, Inc.
 The Penrose Annual, a London-based review of graphic arts (1895–1982)
 Penrose Building, a building of Somerville College, Oxford
 Penrose Medal, awarded by the Geological Society of America

See also
 
 Penrhos (disambiguation)